Richard Sale may refer to:

Dick Sale (1919–1987), English cricketer and schoolmaster
Richard Sale (cricketer) (1889–1970), English cricketer and schoolmaster
Richard Sale (director) (1911–1993), American screenwriter and film director
Richard Sale (journalist) (born 1939), American journalist and novelist